Tax1-binding protein 1 is a protein that in humans is encoded by the TAX1BP1 gene.

Interactions 

TAX1BP1 has been shown to interact with TNFAIP3 and TRAF6. TAX1BP1 binds to TNFAIP3 or TRAF6 and suppresses NF-kappaB transcriptional activation.

References

Further reading